Ukman (Uqman) is a rural locality (a village) in Staronadezhdinsky Selsoviet, Blagoveshchensky District, Bashkortostan, Russia. The population was 28 as of 2010. There are 3 streets.

Geography 
Ukman is located 37 km east of Blagoveshchensk (the district's administrative centre) by road. Sokolovskoye is the nearest rural locality.

References 

Rural localities in Blagoveshchensky District